The Keita dynasty ruled pre-imperial and imperial Mali from the 11th century into the early 17th century. It was a Muslim dynasty, and its rulers claimed descent from Bilal Keita (also known as Bilal ibn Ribah), despite Bilal having been of Abyssinian origin.

Bilal Keita was a freed slave who accepted Islam and became one of the Sahabahs of Muhammad. Bilal Keita bears the distinction of being the first muezzin in Islam. According to Mandinka/Bambara  accounts invented after their conversion to Islam and passed down by djelis (Muslim chroniclers), Bilal had seven sons, one of whom settled in Manden (Mandinka traditional territory). This son, Lawalo Keita, had a son named Latal Kalabi Keita, who later sired Damul Kalabi Keita. It was common in most royal dynasties to try to link their origins to some divine or religious personalities and was common across cultures and religions. Damul Kalabi Keita's son was Lahilatoul Keita and the first faama of the city of Niani. It is through Lahilatoul that the Keita clan becomes a ruling dynasty, though only over the small area around Niani.

There would be nine faamas of Niani prior to the founding of the Mali Empire. Its first mansa would be Sundiata Keita. This is when Mari Jata is crowned and Keita becomes a clan name. A couple of generations after him, his great-nephew, Mansa Musa Keita I of Mali, made a celebrated pilgrimage to Mecca which established his reputation as the richest man of his day. The dynasty he belonged to remained a major power in West Africa from 1235 until the breakup of the Mali Empire around 1610. Rivals from within the clan founded smaller kingdoms within contemporary Mali and Guinea. Today, the surname Keita belongs only to one royal family in Africa. Of the members of these modern "daughter dynasties", the late politician Modibo Keita and the musician Salif Keita are arguably the most famous.

Ancestors

List of royal faamas of Manden (capital — Kangaba)

List of royal faamas of Manden (capital — Dodugu)

List of imperial mansas of Mali (capital — Niani)

List of post-imperial mansas of Mali (capital — Kangaba)

See also
Mali Empire
Faama
Mansa
Modibo Keita
Salif Keita 
List of Sunni Muslim dynasties

Further reading
 (on the Kings of Mali)

References

Sources

Mali Empire
Muslim dynasties